is a 2001 Japanese animated futuristic dieselpunk drama film based upon Osamu Tezuka's 1949 manga of the same name. The film was directed by Rintaro, written by Katsuhiro Otomo, and produced by Madhouse, with conceptual support from Tezuka Productions.

Plot 

Humans and robots coexist in the multi-layered city of Metropolis, although robots are discriminated against and segregated to the lowest levels of the city. Most humans in Metropolis are unemployed and impoverished, with many blaming robots for taking their jobs.

Duke Red, Metropolis’s unofficial ruler and wealthiest citizen, has recently completed construction of The Ziggurat, a massive skyscraper which he claims will allow mankind to extend its power across the planet. A wayward robot disrupts the Ziggurat's opening ceremony, prompting Duke Red's adopted son Rock, the leader of an anti-robot paramilitary organization known as the Marduks, to shoot it down. Meanwhile, private detective Shunsaku Ban and his young nephew/assistant Kenichi Shikishima have traveled from Japan to Metropolis to apprehend rogue scientist Dr. Laughton, wanted for organ trafficking and human rights violations. Unbeknownst to Shunsaku, Duke Red has hired Dr. Laughton to secretly build a highly advanced android, modeled and named after his deceased daughter Tima, with the intention of using her as the central control unit for a powerful superweapon hidden at the top of the Ziggurat. Duke Red's plans are disrupted however when Rock learns of Tima's existence, and fearing for his father's safety, shoots Laughton and sets his laboratory ablaze.

Discovering the burning laboratory, Shunsaku locates the dying Laughton, who directs Shunsaku to a notebook containing his research. Meanwhile, Kenichi stumbles upon the newly activated Tima. The two fall into the sewers and are separated from Shunsaku. While Shunsaku searches for his nephew, Kenichi and Tima search for a way back up to the street level. They grow close as Kenichi teaches Tima how to speak, both unaware that she is a robot. Learning that Tima survived the lab's destruction, Rock and his subordinates hunt them relentlessly. The pair encounter a group of unemployed human laborers who stage an armed revolution against Metropolis's leaders and robot workers.

Unhappy with the Duke's popularity and influence, the president and the mayor of Metropolis try to use the revolution to overthrow Red and regain control of Metropolis. However, the president's top military commander, General Kusai Skunk is revealed to be one of Red's subordinates and assassinates them both. Red then imposes martial law and violently suppresses the revolution. In the aftermath, Kenichi reunites with Shunsaku, but Rock, who exposes Tima as a robot, wounds him. Red disowns Rock and removes him from command of the Marduks for attempting to kill Tima before taking her and Kenichi away to the Ziggurat.

Still determined to eliminate her and regain his father's affection, Rock kidnaps and deactivates Tima, who is now confused about her identity. Having tracked Rock, Shunsaku recovers Tima, and following instructions from Laughton's notebook, reactivates her. The two discover Kenichi is being held in the Ziggurat, but Duke Red and the Marduks capture them while the pair are en route. They are brought to the top of the Ziggurat, where Tima confronts Duke Red about whether she is a human or a robot. Duke Red tells her she is "superhuman" and destined to rule the world from her 'throne', the control system for the Ziggurat's superweapon. Disguised as one of the Ziggurat's maids, Rock shoots Tima in the shoulder, exposing her internal circuitry.

Horrified by her true identity, Tima goes insane, causing her implanted military protocols to take control. She proceeds to physically integrate with the throne and orders a biological and nuclear attack on humanity as punishment for abusing and discriminating against robots. While the others flee, Kenichi tries to reason with Tima. Robots all across Metropolis, drawn by Tima's command, assault the Ziggurat and attack Duke Red and his forces. Not wanting "filthy robots" to kill his father, Rock triggers an overload in the superweapon, killing himself and Red in a massive explosion. As the Ziggurat starts to collapse around them, Kenichi finally reaches Tima and separates her from the throne. Still in a confused state, Tima tries to kill Kenichi, but falls off the tower in the struggle. Out of love for her, Kenichi tries to save Tima and pull her up using one of the cables still grafted to her arm. As the cable begins to fray, Tima remembers the time Kenichi taught her language and asks Kenichi, "Who am I?", before the cable snaps and she falls to her presumed death. The Ziggurat collapses, destroying a large part of Metropolis.

Afterwards, Kenichi searches the ruins and discovers a group of robots have salvaged some of Tima's parts in an effort to rebuild her. While Shunsaku and many other human survivors are evacuated, Kenichi chooses to remain behind to help the survivors rebuild. A photograph shown during the end credits reveals Kenichi opened a robot workshop, named after him and Tima.

Divergence between manga and anime 
Tezuka's original manga centers around the artificial humanoid Mitchi, who is able to fly and change sex and who is pursued by Duke Red and his Red Party who intend to use Mitchi for destructive purposes. Shunsaku Ban and his nephew Kenichi find Mitchi after her creator, Dr. Charles Laughton, is killed and they protect her as they search for her parents. Unlike Tima's desire to be human, the cause for Mitchi's destructive rampage in the manga's climax is the revelation that, as a robot, she has no parents.

The 2001 film incorporates more elements from the Fritz Lang film Metropolis.  When making the original Metropolis manga, Tezuka said that the only inspiration he got from Fritz Lang's Metropolis was a still image from the film where a female robot was being born.  In addition to adopting set designs of the original film, the 2001 film has more emphasis on a strong and pervasive theme of class struggle in a dystopian, plutocratic society and expands it to examine the relationship of robots with their human masters.  (This relationship was explored by Tezuka in great detail with his popular series Astro Boy.)  The anime adaptation also removes many of the more fanciful elements out of Tezuka's manga, such as a flying, gender swapping humanoid.  Here, Mitchi is replaced by "Tima", who is permanently female and cannot fly. In this version, Kenichi is an assistant to his uncle and forms a very strong friendship with Tima even though neither know she's a robot. Tima and Kenichi seem to care for each other deeply, as seen when Tima is worried about Kenichi when he's unconscious. Kenichi even goes so far as to remove Tima from the throne in an effort to save her and not allow her to become a weapon of evil. Tima was taught language by Kenichi and that she was someone unique. She also considered him her only family because he was kind to her and protected her; it seems that she loved Kenichi very much.  It can be assumed that Kenichi fell in love with Tima, shown in many scenes when he blushes when he sees her writing his name so she wouldn't forget him. Kenichi didn't seem to care if Tima was robot or not, showing that he was willing to rescue her because of how much he cared for her. Tima only remembered Kenichi when he tried to save her because of everything he taught her. Tima's relationship with Kenichi ends, however, when Tima accepts her identity as a robot over that of a female human, triggering a robot revolution.

Duke Red is shown to be both a cruel and evil leader and father; it is repeatedly shown that he does not care about Rock or even consider Rock his son despite adopting him; the character Rock also deviates from the manga. He only sees Tima as a weapon to destroy humanity and even considers Tima and Rock inferior to him and anyone who is loyal to him. While his real daughter (also named Tima) died, he only rebuilt her humanoid self just to use her and has no regard or affection for what she needs. He also ignores Tima’s questions about her being human or not, showing that he does not care if Tima feels emotions or not.

Rock wasn't in the original manga, and according to the writer of the film, he was added to pay homage to Tezuka's science fiction adventure style of storytelling, while also adding depth to the story’s background and the world around it. Rock is meant to represent humanity’s dark side, and the negative emotions associated with those aspects. He also echoes Tima's story and can be considered another side of it, as they are both neglected children engineered by their father to be tools of war. In Rock's case however, he was cast aside and unwanted by Duke Red. Their stories ultimately converge, coming full circle when they both lead to their father’s downfall, with his legacy quite literally collapsing to the ground.

The film's Ziggurat combines the New Tower of Babel from Lang's original film and the manga’s Cathedral.

Themes

Portrayal of robots 
The Shinto religion has a delineation between the animate and inanimate. Shinto kami can be spirits, humans, objects, or in this case, robots. Therefore, robots are viewed favorably in both the manga and the film, but especially in the film, where there is a nearly equal number of robot and human characters. Most humans, like Kenichi and Shinsaku Ban, tend to sympathize with robots, causing the audience to view the Marduks and their hostility toward robots as antagonistic.

Cast

Production 
Osamu Tezuka had originally derived inspiration from Fritz Lang's 1927 German silent science fiction film of the same name, despite not actually having seen it. The manga and Lang's film do not share plot elements. The 2001 film borrowed from Lang's film more directly and incorporated plot elements from it.

During the days of Mushi Productions, Hayashi asked Tezuka if he wanted to let him make a feature based on the manga, but immediately rejected the idea.

The film took five years to create. This made it the most expensive anime film up until then, surpassing Otomo's Akira (1988). In turn, its budget record was later surpassed by Otomo's Steamboy (2004).

Soundtrack 

The Metropolis soundtrack consists mainly of New Orleans-style jazz music and orchestral score composed by Toshiyuki Honda and features Atsuki Kimura's cover of "St. James Infirmary Blues" and the ending theme "There'll Never Be Good-Bye" by Minako "Mooki" Obata. The soundtrack album is available on King Records.

During the film's climactic scene, the song "I Can't Stop Loving You" performed by Ray Charles was used as most of the audio when the Ziggurat was destroyed, with sound effects only audible later on in the scene. Likely due to licensing reasons, the song was not included on the soundtrack album.

Release 
The film was first released in Japan on May 26, 2001. In the United States, the film was given a PG-13 rating by the MPAA for "violence and images of destruction" and a TV-14-LV rating when it aired on Adult Swim. It was also one of the first anime films to be submitted for consideration for Best Animated Film at the Academy Awards.

Metropolis was first released on VHS, and is now available in North America as both a 2-disc DVD, with the second disc being a MiniDVD (called a "Pocket DVD"), and a Blu-ray.

In both the United Kingdom and Ireland, Eureka Entertainment acquired the film's distribution rights as a means to release the film on Blu-ray in both countries. The UK and Ireland Blu-rays were released on January 16, 2017.

Toho-Towa Distribution, the foreign film distribution division of the film's original Japanese distributor, Toho, also handled the Japanese distribution of the 1927 version of Metropolis.

As the license of the German Metropolis is held by the Friedrich Wilhelm Murnau Foundation, the film was released under the title Robotic Angel.

Reception 
Metropolis received highly positive reviews: based on 65 reviews from Rotten Tomatoes, Metropolis received an overall 86% Certified Fresh approval rating, with an average rating of 7.30/10. The site's critical consensus states that "A remarkable technical achievement, Metropolis' eye-popping visuals more than compensate for its relatively routine story." Film critic Roger Ebert, writing for the Chicago Sun-Times, gave Metropolis a 4/4, calling it "one of the best animated films I have ever seen."

See also 

 Osamu Tezuka
 Osamu Tezuka's Star System

References

External links 
 Official website (English)
 
 
 
 
 
 

2001 science fiction action films
2000s dystopian films
2001 animated films
2001 films
2001 anime films
Anime films based on manga
Animated films about robots
Animated films set in the future
Cyberpunk anime and manga
Dieselpunk films
Drama anime and manga
Dystopian films
Films about artificial intelligence
Films about cities
Films based on works by Osamu Tezuka
Films directed by Rintaro
Japanese adult animated films
Japanese animated science fiction films
Japanese drama films
Japanese science fiction action films
Madhouse (company)
Steampunk anime and manga
Works based on Metropolis (1927 film)
TriStar Pictures films
TriStar Pictures animated films
Films about discrimination
2000s American films